Byron MacGregor (March 3, 1948 – January 3, 1995) was a Canadian news anchor and news director.

Career
Born Gary Lachlan Mack in Calgary, Alberta, he became, on his twenty-second birthday, the youngest news director at AM radio station CKLW in Windsor, Ontario, which also served Detroit, Michigan, as well as Toledo and Cleveland in Ohio and covered twenty-eight states and six provinces. This was during its "Big 8/20-20 News" period, and also around the time American company RKO General was forced to sell the station, due to a change in Canadian ownership rules that prohibited foreign firms from controlling Canadian licensed stations.

In 1973, he read a Toronto newspaper editorial written by Gordon Sinclair of CFRB in Toronto, a commentary about America. MacGregor then read the patriotic commentary on CKLW Radio as part of a public affairs program and, due to the huge response, he was asked to record "The Americans" with "America the Beautiful" performed by The Detroit Symphony Orchestra as the background music. Both MacGregor and Sinclair released recorded versions of the commentary. MacGregor's version of the record (released on Detroit-based Westbound Records) became a bigger hit than Sinclair's in the United States, reaching #4 on the Billboard Hot 100 chart the week of February 9, 1974. It became a gold record. In Canada, MacGregor's version hit #42, while Sinclair's hit #30. His recording has sold over three-and-a-half-million copies, and all of his proceeds have been donated to the American Red Cross. MacGregor was honored with the "National Americanism Award".

MacGregor was known for his deep voice and high-energy announcing style at CKLW, and for writing copy in a manner that was compared to that of sensational tabloid newspapers. He later made the transition to a more traditional anchoring and interviewing style when he moved to WWJ Newsradio 950, the CBS Radio all-news station in Detroit, where he served as both morning and afternoon drive anchor during his thirteen-year occupancy. MacGregor also became the first newsman in Detroit to simultaneously anchor prime-time newscasts on both radio (WWJ) and television (WKBD-TV 50).

By the mid-1980s, MacGregor held dual citizenships in Canada and the United States. He died on January 3, 1995, from pneumonia. His funeral took place at the McCabe Funeral Home in Farmington Hills, Michigan, and at the Shrine of the Little Flower Catholic Church in Royal Oak, Michigan. Having died two months short of his 47th birthday, he was survived by his wife of nineteen years, Jo-Jo Shutty-MacGregor. She was the first female helicopter news and traffic reporter in North America, and today works for WWJ and WOMC and the Metro News Networks. MacGregor was also survived by his sister, Leilani Harvie; by his mother, Murdena MacGregor Mack; and by his brother, Hudson Mack, who was news anchor at CIVI-TV in Victoria, British Columbia.

References

1948 births
1995 deaths
People from Calgary
Canadian radio personalities
Radio personalities from Detroit